Salvatore Robert Iaquinto (born March 1, 1968) is an American politician. From 2006–2013 he served in the Virginia House of Delegates, representing the 84th district in Virginia Beach. He is a member of the Republican Party.

Iaquinto announced that he would not run for reelection in 2013. On May 31, 2013, he was given an interim appointment as a judge of the Virginia Beach General District Court, effective July 1. Iaquinto said he would resign from the House, effective on the date of his swearing-in.

Notes

External links
 (campaign finance)

1968 births
Living people
Republican Party members of the Virginia House of Delegates
Virginia lawyers
University of Tennessee alumni
Regent University School of Law alumni
Politicians from Virginia Beach, Virginia
People from Manhasset, New York
21st-century American politicians